"2AM" (stylized as "2AM.") is a song by American singer Adrian Marcel. It was released on February 4, 2014, as his commercial debut single. The song features a guest verse from California-based rapper Sage the Gemini and was produced by Chrishan.

Composition
According to Ryan Dombal of Pitchfork, the beat of "2AM" consists of four synth notes with "standard-grade ratchet drums".

Music video
The music video for the song was directed by Martín Estévez and premiered via Marcel's Vevo channel on May 2, 2014.

Charts

Certifications

References

2014 singles
2014 songs
Songs written by Christopher Dotson
Republic Records singles